Como is a neighborhood within the University community of Minneapolis. It is sometimes referred to as Southeast Como, due to many of its streets ending in SE, and possibly to differentiate it from the Como neighborhood in neighboring Saint Paul. Its boundaries are East Hennepin Avenue to the north, 33rd Avenue Southeast (the eastern city limit) to the east, the Southeast Industrial Area to the south, and Interstate 35W to the west.

Como features many amenities for its residents:  Van Cleve Park Community Center, the Como Student Community Co-op, the University Childcare Center, Dar Al-Farooq mosque, SE Christian Church, and the Como Congregational Church building (designed in 1886 by Charles Sedgwick).  The #3 busline is convenient to all who live in Como and provides easy transportation to Downtown Minneapolis, all of the University of Minnesota Twin Cities campuses, and Downtown St. Paul. The high-traffic business roads, industrial zones, and active railroads that surround Como contrast sharply with the residential character of the core Como neighborhood. The housing stock consists of modest early 20th-century bungalows and Victorian and twenties-era homes mixed with a scattering of newer duplexes and single family homes. Some areas (e.g. along Como, 15th and Hennepin Avenues) have post-60's two-story walk-up apartment buildings.

Commercial activity is focused on Como and East Hennepin Avenues. The neighborhood is served by a services business hub along Como Avenue with grocery stores, dentist, barber shop, coffee houses, restaurants, and auto service station.

Demographics
As of 2020, the population of Como was 6,455, split 58.1% male and 41.9% female.  Over 95% of residents were at least a high school graduate (or equivalent), and 69.6% had earned a bachelor's degree or higher. 

17.4% of the population were foreign-born residents, and 20.1% spoke a language other than English at home. According to the American Community Survey 5-year estimates (2016-2020), the top non-English languages spoken in Como were Spanish (spoken by 10.5% of the population), Hmong (1.5%), Vietnamese (1.3%), Somali (1.1%), and Russian (0.6%). 7.7% of residents spoke English less than "very well".

8.4% of households had no access to a vehicle. Among workers 16 years and older, 54.2% commuted to work via car, 22.1% used public transit, and 23.7 walked, biked, worked at home, or used some other method. The average household income in Como was $64,333. 38.7% of residents lived below the poverty line, and 5.3% were unemployed. 79.4% of housing in the neighborhood was renter-occupied.

Governance
The Southeast Como neighborhood is split between City of Minneapolis Wards 1 and 2. It also falls into the 2nd Police Precinct.

Trivia
Como Avenue, which forms the spine of the residential neighborhood was originally a Territorial Road laid out in 1851, called the Willow River Road (Willow River is today's Hudson, WI).
Later, when St. Paul named Lake Como and it became a popular recreational spot, the section of the WillowRiver/Hudson Road that led to the lake from Minneapolis became known as the Como Road.
The first residential blocks were platted in 1882 by James Tallmadge Elwell.
Maria Sanford, the first female professor at the U of M, lived in the neighborhood and was active in the community church.
General Mills built their research laboratory here in 1930 and created Cheerioats, which is known as Cheerios today.  In the early 1950s, GM's mechanical division invented the Ryan Flight Recorder, more famously known as the "black box".

References

External links
Minneapolis Neighborhood Profile - Como
Southeast Como Improvement Association
Ward 2 Blog

Neighborhoods in Minneapolis